Refik Kolić (Bijelo Polje, 8 November 1965) Is a Bosnian folk music singer who lives and works in Sweden. His famous songs are "Dođi", "Kaja" and "Svadba bosanska" (Bosnian Wedding).

References

1965 births
Living people
Bosniaks of Bosnia and Herzegovina
20th-century Bosnia and Herzegovina male singers
Bosnia and Herzegovina folk-pop singers
Bosnia and Herzegovina emigrants to Sweden